Georgi Aleksandrov (born 21 May 2001) is a Bulgarian professional footballer who plays as a centre-back for Etar Veliko Tarnovo.

Career
Aleksandrov joined Levski Sofia's academy at the age of 10. He captained the U-19 team before signing for Vitosha Bistritsa in the First League. After the team got relegated to the second division and subsequently dissolved, on 2 October 2020, he returned to his boyhood club Levski Sofia on a two-year deal. On 21 October 2020, he made his debut in a 4–1 away win against Partizan Cherven Bryag in the Round of 32 of the Bulgarian Cup. In January 2022, Aleksandrov signed with Etar Veliko Tarnovo.

References

External links
 
 Profile at LevskiSofia.info
 Profile at Etarvt.bg

Living people
2001 births
Bulgarian footballers
Footballers from Sofia
Association football central defenders
FC Vitosha Bistritsa players
PFC Levski Sofia players
First Professional Football League (Bulgaria) players
Second Professional Football League (Bulgaria) players